The Groat–Gates House is a house located in northeast Portland, Oregon listed on the National Register of Historic Places.

See also
 National Register of Historic Places listings in Northeast Portland, Oregon

References

1892 establishments in Oregon
Houses completed in 1892
Houses on the National Register of Historic Places in Portland, Oregon
Kerns, Portland, Oregon
Northeast Portland, Oregon
Stick-Eastlake architecture in Oregon
Portland Historic Landmarks